Waidhaus is a municipality in the district of Neustadt an der Waldnaab in Bavaria, Germany. It lies near the border with the Czech Republic, and near the major border crossing between Bavaria and the Czech Republic, where the Bavarian A6 meets the Czech D5 motorway. The closest towns are on the German side Pleystein and on the Czech side Rozvadov.
A gas pipeline and a powerline also cross the border between Bavaria and the Czech Republic there.

Neighbouring communities 
The neighbouring communities clockwise: Rozvadov, Eslarn, Pleystein, Georgenberg.

References

Neustadt an der Waldnaab (district)
Czech Republic–Germany border crossings